Finger foods are small, individual portions of food that are eaten out of hand. They are often served at social events. The ideal finger food usually does not create any mess (i.e. no crumbs, drips, or any kind of mess), but this criterion is often overlooked in order to include foods like tacos. One origin for finger foods is the French canapé.

History of finger foods 

Finger foods do not share common origin, history, or identity. Most of them originate in hors d'oeuvre like canapé. During the Middle Ages formal French meals were served with entremets between the serving of plates. These secondary dishes could be either actual food dishes, or elaborate displays and even dramatic or musical presentations. In the 14th century, recipes for entremets were mostly made with meat, fish, pork and vegetables. By the 15th century the elaborate display and performances were served up between courses, and could be edible or displays of subjects relevant to the host, created in butter sculpture or other types of crafted work. With the introduction in the 17th century of service à la française, where all the dishes are laid out at once in very rigid symmetrical fashion, entremets began to change in meaning but were still mainly savoury. Along with this came elaborate silver and ceramic table displays as well as pièces montées. The entremets were placed between the other dishes within the main work of the meal. One kind of finger food is the French canapé, known since the late 1700s. Canapés began as slices of toasted or fried bread with various toppings. Their name, literally 'sofa', was inspired from how the toppings "sat" on the bread as though it were a sofa. Over time, canapés became a word to describe all finger foods served at parties.

Drinks before dinner became a custom towards the end of the 19th century. As this new fashion caught on, the British took inspiration from the French to begin serving hors d'oeuvres before dinner. A cocktail party is considered a small gathering with mixed drinks and light snacks. Hors d'oeuvres may be served as the only food offering at cocktail parties and receptions, where no dinner is served afterward. After the end of prohibition in the United States, the cocktail party gained acceptance. Prior to the First World War, American dinner guests would be expected to enter the dining room immediately where drinks would be served at the table with appetisers. This changed by the 1920s, when hors d'oeuvres were served prior to a non-alcoholic cocktail; however, after the repeal of Prohibition in the United States, cocktail parties became popular with many different hors d'oeuvres meant as something to help counter the stronger drinks. It is the cocktail party that helped transfer the hors d'oeuvres from the formal dining table to the mobility of the serving tray. These appetisers passed around the cocktail party may also be referred to as canapés.

Finger foods and prohibition 
Canapés were often served in speakeasies during American Prohibition. Following the enactment of American Prohibition laws in 1920, many people drank in secret, often in speakeasies. To ensure that guests did not appear intoxicated after leaving to avoid detection, speakeasies often served finger foods throughout the night. These finger foods also allowed guests to eat while drinking because of the food's small size.

After Prohibition, canapés were often served at cocktail parties.

Modern finger foods 
There is a wide variety of finger foods. Contemporary finger foods are often served as fast food as well as at formal events.

Fast food 

Most fast food is finger food. Finger food is quick to eat, and can be eaten on the go. For producers, the simple recipes of finger foods allows them to create new menu options that share ingredients.

Parties and events 
Finger foods are often served at formal events and celebrations in the form of passed hors d'oeuvre, where they create a casual, relaxed atmosphere and keep guests' hands and fingers entertained.

References

Further reading
 The McDonaldization of Society (SAGE Publications, Inc.), George Ritzer 

Eating behaviors of humans
Street food